Richard "Dick" McCourt (born 12 August 1976) is an English entertainer and presenter. He is best known as one half of the comic duo Dick and Dom, with the other being Dominic Wood. His older brother is fellow television presenter James McCourt.

Education
McCourt was educated at Tapton School, a state comprehensive in Sheffield. At Norton College, building on his experience as a volunteer at Sheffield's hospital radio station, he studied audio, video and print media, receiving the BTEC National Diploma in media production in 1994.

Television
McCourt gained his experience in Sheffield presenting Hospital Television and local television throughout the early '90s. He is best known for co-presenting, with Dominic Wood, Dick & Dom in da Bungalow. The show ran on CBBC and BBC One, from 2002 to 2006 and was famous for its zany games, often played in public places. Dick and Dom had other CBBC hits including The Legend of Dick and Dom, Diddy TV and Absolute Genius with Dick and Dom. From 2007 to 2008 McCourt and Wood hosted the daytime version of Are You Smarter Than A 10 Year Old? on Sky One.

 In-vision continuity 'Broom Cupboard' presentation at CBBC (1996–2000)
 On Safari on CITV (2000)
 Bring It On Children's BBC 1 (2001–2002)
 CBBC Channel 'Presentation' (2002–2003)
 Dick & Dom in da Bungalow CBBC (2002–2006)
 Ask the Family BBC 2 (2005)
 Are you Smarter than a 10 Year Old SKY ONE (2007–2008)
 The Legend of Dick and Dom CBBC  (2008–2011)
 Da Dick and Dom Dairies (Best of Da Bungalow) CBBC (2009)
 Dick and Dom Go Wild CBBC (2010–2011)
 Bananas in Pyjamas V/O (2011–2012)
 Splatalot! CBBC  (2011–2013)
 Dick and Dom's Hoopla CBBC (2012)
 Blue Peter: You Decide! (2013)
 Absolute Genius with Dick and Dom CBBC  (2012–2016)
 Diddy Movies CBBC (2012–2014)
 Diddy TV CBBC (2016–2018)

Radio

 Hospital radio Sheffield Children's Hospital (1988–1996)
 Local radio (1993–1996)
 BBC Radio 1's Sunday morning 10am1pm show, co-hosting with Dominic Wood (2007-2008)
 BBC Sounds' Diddy Pod  (2019–2020)
 Cash From Chaos (2019)
 The Dick and Dom Debate (2020)

Actor
On stage, McCourt has appeared in many productions, including:

Aladdin at the Empire Theatre in Sunderland (1999/2000)
Cinderella at the Derngate Theatre, Northampton (2000–2001)
Aladdin at the Theatre Royal, Bath (2001/2002)
Dick Whittington at the Lyceum Theatre, Sheffield (2002/2003)
Spamalot at the Playhouse Theatre in London's West End (Lead role) (2013/2014)Butlin's Dick vs Dom (Stage show) (2014/2016/2018/2020)Cinderella at the Birmingham Arena (2015/2016)Peter Pan at the Worthing Pier Pavilion Theatre (2016/2017)Dick vs Dom (Stage show) (UK tour)Beauty and the Beast at the De Montfort Hall in Leicester (2017/2018)Edinburgh Festival Dick vs Dom (Stage show)Peter Pan at the Empire Theatre in Sunderland (2018/2019)Beauty and the Beast at the Fairfield Halls in Croydon (2021/2022)

In 2011, McCourt and Wood appeared in the Feature film Horrid Henry: The Movie, playing 2 Cool 4 School presenters. They also take their live show Dick vs Dom to various festivals including Camp Bestival, The Big Festival, Kendal Calling, CarFest, Chalfest, Wychwood, Standon Calling, Hay Festival and BST in Hyde Park.

Charity work
In 2008, McCourt received the Association of Colleges Gold Award, in recognition of his success in media. The award cited his work advising students interested in media careers. He is an ambassador for Alzheimer's Society and Alzheimer's Research UK and he supports Dreamflight, WellChild and Children in Need''. In April 2010, he ran the London Marathon. He ran the London Marathon again in 2021. He has also taken part in several Bupa' Manchester 10k and Great Yorkshire Run's to raise funds for the Alzheimer's Society. In 2006 and 2009 he cycled from London to Paris and has trekked the Great Wall Of China all in aid of Dementia research.

Personal life

McCourt supports his home city club Sheffield Wednesday and Manchester United.

McCourt currently resides with his long-term partner Katrina Bryan who he has been dating since 2015. In 2019, Bryan confirmed their engagement via her Instagram page.

In 2021, McCourt announced the birth of his first child on Instagram.

References

External links 
 UKGameshows.com: Dick and Dom in Da Bungalow
 
 Dick and Dom's Radio 1 webpage
 Saturday Mornings

1976 births
Living people
20th-century British male actors
21st-century British male actors
British children's television presenters
British male television actors
British television presenters
Male actors from Sheffield
People educated at Tapton School